The Poet Laureate of Vermont is the poet laureate for the U.S. state of Vermont. Robert Frost was the first poet named as Laureate by Joint House Resolution 54 of the Vermont General Assembly in 1961, less than two years before his death. The current position of State Poet, a four-year appointment, was created by Executive Order 69 in 1988. In 2007, the designation was changed to Poet Laureate.

List of Poets Laureate

The following have held the position:
 Robert Frost (1961-1963)
 Galway Kinnell (1989–1993)
 Louise Gluck (1994–1998)
 Ellen Bryant Voigt (1999–2002)
 Grace Paley (2003–2007)
 Ruth Stone (2007–2011)
 Sydney Lea (2011–2015) 
 Chard deNiord (2015–2019)
 Mary Ruefle (2019–present)

See also

 Poet laureate
 List of U.S. states' poets laureate
 United States Poet Laureate

References

External links
 Vermont Poet Laureate at Library of Congress

 
Vermont culture
American Poets Laureate